Shahid or Shahed is a given name translating to "Witness" in Arabic and "Beloved" in Persian, mostly found in South Asia.

Shahid, or Shaheed (Arabic: شهيد šahīd, plural: شُهَدَاء šuhadāʾ; female: šahīda), originates from the Quranic Arabic word meaning "witness" and is also used to denote a martyr in Islam. The word shahid in Arabic means "witness".

It is derived form the same root š-h-d (c.f. Shahadah). It is also used as a  surname, Aš-šāhid  "the witness"

Shahid is a Muslim boy name and it is Arabic in origin with multiple meanings. The name is most famous in Asian countries like Pakistan, India, Bangladesh and Afghanistan.

The related term  Shahid , "martyr", is used as A martyr who is slain in the cause of God's religion; one who is slain by unbelievers in the field of battle; one who is slain fighting in the cause of God's religion, so called because the angels of mercy are present with him; because the angels are present at the washing of his corpse, or at the removal of his soul to Paradise; or because God and his angels are witnesses for him of his title to a place in Paradise; or because he is one of those who shall be required to bear witness on the day of resurrection.

People named Shahid

Given name
Shahid Khaqan Abbasi (born 1958), politician and former Prime Minister of Pakistan
Shahid Afridi (born 1980), Pakistani cricketer 
Shahid Ahmed (born 1988), Pakistani footballer
Shahid Ahmed (cricketer) (born 1975), cricket player
Shahid Azmi (1977-2010), Indian lawyer and human rights activist
Shaheed Kader, Indian film director
Shahid Kapoor (born 1981), Bollywood actor
Shahid Khan (disambiguation), multiple people
Shaheed Latif (1913–1967), Indian film producer
Shahid Parvez Khan (born 1955), Indian sitar player
Shaied Nazir (born 1980), convicted of the racially motivated murder of Ross Parker
Shahid Mahmood (1939–2020), Pakistani cricketer

Stage name
Shahid (actor), Pakistani actor active from 1971 to 1998

Surname
Abdulla Shahid Maldivian MP
Imran Shahid, ringleader of gang responsible for the racially motivated murder of Kriss Donald in Scotland
 Leila Shahid, Palestinian diplomat
 Mohammed Shahid (born 14 April 1960), Indian field hockey player
 Munib Shahid, Chairman of Hematology and Oncology at the Faculty of Medicine of the American University of Beirut
 Rashid Shaheed (born 1998), American football player
 Serene Husseini Shahid; writer, promoter of Palestinian costumes.
Zeeshan Shahid, convicted of the racially motivated murder of Kriss Donald in Scotland
 Ash-Shakur Nafi-Shahid Stevenson aka Shakur Stevenson.Two time unified world champion and Olympic silver medalist.

Legendary figures
Shahid ibn Jarr (Shehid ibn Jerr), the name for Seth in Yazidism

References

See also

Shahid (disambiguation)
Shahidi (surname)
All pages beginning with Shaheed
All pages beginning with Shahid

Arabic-language surnames
Arabic masculine given names
Masculine given names
Bengali Muslim surnames